"Sex on the Phone" is a song recorded by German eurodance project E-Rotic. It was released in June 1995 as the third single from their debut album Sex Affairs . As the title suggests it, the main theme of the song is phone sex. The single reached number six in the German Singles Chart and was ranked for 14 weeks. It was also a hit in Austria where it reached number two and totaled 14 weeks in the top 30. In other European countries, it achieved a minor success, failing the top 20 in most of them. The song was later included on E-Rotic's compilations Greatest Tits (The Best of) and Dancemania presents E-ROTIC Megamix.

In 2009, the song was covered by Lyane Leigh, the original singer of "Sex on the Phone", under her stage name S.E.X. Appeal, and was released as single.

Music video
The music video for "Sex on the Phone" was directed by Zoran Bihac.

Track listings
 CD maxi - Germany, Netherlands and Sweden
 "Sex on the Phone" (radio edit) — 3:54
 "Sex on the Phone" (extended version) — 6:06
 "Sex on the Phone" (D1 remix) — 5:44
 "Sex on the Phone" (D2 remix) — 5:51

 CD maxi - German Remixes
 "Sex on the Phone" (the hotline remix) — 4:31
 "Sex on the Phone" (the house remix) — 4:21
 "Sex on the Phone" (the fast and hot sex Max remix) — 5:12

 12" maxi - German Remixes
 "Sex on the Phone" (the hotline remix) — 4:31
 "Sex on the Phone" (the house remix) — 4:21
 "Sex on the Phone" (the fast and hot sex Max remix) — 5:12

 12" maxi - Germany
 "Sex on the Phone" (extended version) — 6:06
 "Sex on the Phone" (D1 remix) — 5:44
 "Sex on the Phone" (D2 remix) — 5:51

 CD single - France
 "Sex on the Phone" (radio edit) — 3:54
 "Sex on the Phone" (extended version) — 6:06

Credits
 Written by David Brandes and John O'Flynn
 Composed by David Brandes and John O'Flynn
 Arranged by Domenico Livrano, Felix J. Gauder and David Brandes, at Bros Studios / Rüssmann Studios / Why Headroom
 Produced by David Brandes, Felix J. Gauder and John O'Flynn
 Published by Cosima Music

Charts

Weekly charts

Year-end charts

S.E.X. Appeal version 

In 2009, "Sex on the Phone" was covered by German trance project S.E.X. Appeal.

Track listings
 CD maxi
 "Sex on the Phone" (radio edit) — 3:40
 "Sex on the Phone" (Bootleggerz radio remix) — 3:38
 "Sex on the Phone" (D.Mand radio remix) — 3:33
 "Sex on the Phone" (album version) — 4:16
 "Sex on the Phone" (Bootleggerz club version) — 5:55
 "Sex on the Phone" (D.Mand club version) — 4:43
 BONUS: "Sex on the Phone" (video clip for Mac and Windows)

 Digital download
 "Sex on the Phone" (radio edit) — 3:40
 "Sex on the Phone" (Bootleggerz radio remix) — 3:38
 "Sex on the Phone" (D.Mand radio remix) — 3:33
 "Sex on the Phone" (album version) — 4:16
 "Sex on the Phone" (Bootleggerz club version) — 5:55
 "Sex on the Phone" (D.Mand club version) — 4:43

References

1995 singles
E-Rotic songs
Songs written by David Brandes
Songs written by Bernd Meinunger
Songs about telephone calls